Members of the New South Wales Legislative Council between 1952 and 1955 were indirectly elected by a joint sitting of the New South Wales Parliament, with 15 members elected every three years. The most recent election was on 30 November 1951, with the term of new members commencing on 23 April 1952. The President was Ernest Farrar until his death in June 1952 and then William Dickson.

See also
First Cahill ministry
Second Cahill ministry

References

Members of New South Wales parliaments by term
20th-century Australian politicians